Silver Bell is a ghost town in the Silver Bell Mountains in Pima County, Arizona, United States. The name "Silver Bell" refers to a more recent ghost town, which was established in 1954 and abandoned in 1984. The original town, established in 1904, was named "Silverbell" and abandoned in the early 1930s. Both towns were utilized and later abandoned due to the mining of copper in the area.

According to James E. Sherman's Ghost Towns of Arizona, Silverbell was "one of the most renowned mining camps in the Southwest," and was also described as "the Hell-hole of Arizona." Today nothing remains of the town other than a cemetery.

The later Silver Bell was established when Asarco shifted its attention back to mining in the Silver Bell Mountains in the early 1950s. Located four miles southeast of the original town site, next to the present-day Silver Bell Mine, the town of Silver Bell was also short-lived, and only a few small ruins remain.

History

Silverbell
The history of mining in the Silver Bell Mountains is fairly convoluted, largely due to the dynamic nature of the copper business in the late nineteenth and early twentieth centuries. According to geologists and researchers, the richest, most densely exploited area occupied a narrow zone along the southwest flank of the range. Although copper was of primary interest, some silver, lead, and gold were also mined.

The first documented prospecting began in the early 1870s under the leadership of Charles O. Brown, who was from Tucson. By mid 1874, he and his partners had opened the Mammoth Lode, the Young America Mine, and a smelter. Other claims and mines established in the latter quarter of the century included the Atlas, Old Boot, and prospector mines; each was exploited by various short-lived partnerships, companies, and lessees. At this time in the American West, it was common for miners working in proximity to form self-governing "mining districts" in the absence of strong territorial authority. Miners elected a leader and a recorder, and they formed committees to establish district rules and boundaries. In time the term "mining district" developed a less formal, more geographical meaning. In the 1890s, two English companies entered the Silver Bell Mining District: the Silver Bell Mining and Smelting Company, Ltd., and the Tucson Mining and Smelting Company, Ltd. Both had very limited success.

By the turn of the century, it must have become clear that consolidation was the best means of achieving profitability, and a partnership under two businessmen named Zeckendorf and Steinfeld managed to acquire a large group of claims in the district. This partnership held one of the most productive mines, the Old Boot. Another group of claims was developed by the Oxide Copper Company; this company retained another major mine, the Young America. In 1901, there was enough mining activity in the district, and enough of a family presence, that Pima County established a public school. It had seventy-five students that year. Two communities were included in the 1900 census: Peltonville, with eighty inhabitants, and Atlas Camp, with fifty-nine.

In 1903, Zeckendorf and his partners sold approximately sixty claims to the Imperial Copper Company. Formed by William Field Staunton, E. B. Gage, and Frank M. Murphy in May 1903, Imperial proceeded to systematically develop its operations in the district. By September 1904, the Arizona Southern Railroad - a fully owned subsidiary of Imperial - was established, built, and operating between Red Rock and Silverbell. Imperial subsequently built a smelter at Sasco, again via a subsidiary; the Southern Arizona Smelting Company, in late 1907. An electrical power plant was also built to supply power to the Sasco smelter, the town of Sasco, the Silver Bell mines, and the town  of Silverbell.

Although Imperial was the foremost mining operation in the Silver Bell Mining District between 1903 and 1911, the Oxhide Copper Company continued operations in the area intermittently until the early 1930s. A third company, the Cleveland-Arizona, organized around 1906. It was succeeded a year later by a company that eventually optioned its claims to Imperial, and ultimately ceased operations in 1919. A lessee continued on until about 1925.

Soon after its inception, Imperial Copper established the "town" of Silverbell over the remains of a mining camp that dated to the 1880s. Reaching a population of 1,000 in 1905, the community included a post office, the offices of Imperial and the railroad, a Wells Fargo station, the Imperial company store, a school, two saloons, a Chinese bakery, a barber, a doctor, a justice of the peace, and a deputy sheriff. By 1907, services expanded to include a company hotel, a cobbler, more barbers, and another bakery; a dairy and a public notary arrived by 1909. E. Glen Baker, the most notable local entrepreneur, also opened a saloon in 1909, and later his ventures encompassed general merchandise store, a billiard parlor, and an auto stage.

The lack of readily available potable water was a constant problem. The high mineral content of the local water made it useless for all but laundry and other cleaning. Even gardening was unsuccessful. Throughout the history of the community, drinking water was imported, first by mule and wagon, and eventually by rail. Water was stored in tanks near the company store, piped twice a day through two taps - one of which was located outside the sheriff's office - and sold to local residents. Sometimes guards were posted at the taps, which were turned on for two hours each morning and evening. Archival sources indicate that men did quit mining and railroad construction jobs and leave the district because they were not able to obtain good drinking water.

In spite of this significant difficulty, growth continued, albeit briefly: the 1910 census lists the population as 1,118 persons in 327 households. At least 247 adult women resided at Silver Bell in 1910, and there were hundreds of children. American, Mexican, O'odham, Chinese, and Japanese individuals were present, though the community was totally segregated. Other occupations not gleaned from business directories but listed in the census report include grocer, butcher, restaurant keeper, boardinghouse keeper, musician, stableman, servant, laundress, teacher, carpenter, teamster, photographer, and prostitute. The company also maintained a hospital and attendant personnel at this time. Additional amenities established around 1910 included two firehouses and a movie house. Strikingly, a 1911 business directory seems to indicate that many of the private businesses soon left, presumably as a result of sudden depopulation tied to the declining fortunes of Imperial.

A bad shaft fire and water difficulties at their Tombstone properties led to bankruptcy and forced Imperial to lease its holdings to Asarco in 1911. Asarco began optioning Imperial claims in 1915, ultimately acquiring all of the company's assets - including the railroad and the smelter at Sasco - by 1919. Under Asarco's early tenure, Silverbell again served as the company headquarters and workers' community. Its population temporarily rebounded to 1,200 in 1920. Although the Sasco smelter closed in 1919, after only about four years of renewed operation, the electrical plant continued to supply power to Silver Bell and the mines. The post office, which had also closed in 1911, was reopened in 1916.

This revival also proved to be brief. After the price of copper dropped in 1920, Asarco shifted its focus to other operations. It ceased mining activity in the Silver Bell District entirely by 1930. During that decade about 500 people lived in Silverbell; by 1931, the population had further declined to about forty-five people, only ten of whom actually lived within the company-owned camp limits. The railroad continued to provide mail, supplies, and limited passenger service until late 1933, when it was dismantled and sold. The Sasco smelter was also demolished at that time, and the post office closed for good in 1934.

Sam McEven
Sam McEven was Silverbell's deputy and the man personally responsible for taming old Silverbell. According to local lore, three men were killed in Silverbell in the three days before McEven's arrival in town. McEven spent the first few months of his time in Silverbell arresting, fining, and jailing "local desperadoes" for carrying concealed weapons.

After a miner named Ramon Castro killed Gracio Manzo, he hid from the law for two weeks in an abandoned mine shaft. As deputy, it was McEven's duty to bring Castro in, but he knew that if he entered the shaft without some sort of protection, he would be an easy target for Castro. He devised a simple but effective shield. Obtaining an ore car, upon which he hung a lamp, McEven pushed the bulletproof barrier ahead of him through the mine shaft until he cornered and captured Castro.

Silver Bell
Asarco fared better than the Silver Bell; the company continued to consolidate all of the major holdings in the district, including those once held by Oxide. In 1952, Asarco began open pit operations in the region, and in 1954 it founded a new town - named Silver Bell - four miles to the southeast of the original town site.

Silver Bell survived in its new form from 1952 through 1984. Mining operations at the Silver Bell Mine eventually ceased in 1984, and the town was disbanded. Copper prices continued to tank, the water and sewerage system in town was beginning to fail, and once-contemporary homes were falling into disrepair. Most of the homes were sold and moved to other locations in and around Tucson. In the late 1980s, there were still a few homes and company structures standing.  Nothing but a  garage (which was the only one in town, belonging to the General Manager) is all that remains. It is pictured above, listed as a "ruin".

In 1989, Asarco purchased the old BS&K Mine, which is located near the original Silverbell site, about a mile east of the Silver Bell Cemetery in Ironwood Forest. Today, a few BS&K buildings remain standing, along with a few old mine shafts and some wrecked vehicles.

Gallery

See also

 Copper mining in Arizona
 Ironwood Forest National Monument
 Silverbell artifacts

References

External links
 Silverbell – ghosttowns.com
 Silverbell – Ghost Town of the Month at azghosttowns.com

Ghost towns in Arizona
Former populated places in Pima County, Arizona
1904 establishments in Arizona Territory
Populated places established in 1904
History of Pima County, Arizona
Asarco
Cemeteries in Arizona
Company towns in Arizona
Mining communities in Arizona